Hausa architecture is the architecture of the Hausa people of Northern Nigeria. Hausa architectural forms include mosques, walls, common compounds, and gates. Hausa traditional architecture is an integral part of how Hausa people construct a sense of interrelatedness with their physical environment. The architectural program used in this society is one disciplined by Isalm and results in a highly organized spatial structure which is used to express features of Hausa culture.

Environment

Geology 
The main portion of the Hausaland consists of pre-Cambrian rocks, but turn into tertiary sediments in the east. The sites of early settlements were often located around inselbergs due to the minerals in these rocks. A large portion of the Hausaland is covered in laterite, which is the most important building material used in Hausa Architecture.

Topography 
The topography  of the Hausaland is suited for using horses for transportation. This has historically allowed for easy transportation of both people and products across the land.

Climate 
The northern portion of the Hausaland has a semi-arid climate while the southern portion is closer to savanna.

Architecture

Building Types 
Where Hausa Architecture differs from other architectural programs across the globe is its limited use of spaces for specialized activities. The main parts of a Hausa city are the defensive wall, the palace, mosques, the market, and domestic buildings. In Hausa buildings, there are three main elements: the primary room, the courtyard, and the wall. With these three components, many variations of buildings have been created for a multitude of uses.

Domestic Architecture 
It is common to see the traditional African pattern of rooms arranged around the courtyard in domestic buildings. The order of building operations follows closely to the pre-Islamic order with the perimeter wall being the most important.

The Hausa Palace 
The Hausa Palace is essentially a larger version of the domestic buildings in Hausa Architecture. Palaces symbolized political power, community solidarity, and religious authority. Palaces are located at the city center, which predates Islamic influence.

Mosques 
Mosques in Hausaland typically consist of one room whose Qibla wall is denoted by a mihrab. The roof may be made of mud, thatch, or - as of recently - tin. The roof may also be accessible for prayer use. There is a typical use of either reinforced columns and support beams or reinforced support arches to help keep the building in place. The decoration is not typically a notable feature of these mosques. Instead, the use of large sculptural forms creates the feeling inside the space, and decoration is used mainly to emphasize the mihrab area. It is usually placed inside a rectangular walled courtyard, with the corners of the building lining up with North, East, South, and West.

Construction 
When first built, a Hausa building will have a crisp, clean, and efficient look that is a product of strict structural discipline. The organic forms for which Hausa Architecture is known results from the erosion process that comes with rain. Each dry season, the buildings are repaired to bring them back to that neat and clean look.

Tubali 

Tubali is the Hausa architectural style predominant in Northern Nigeria, Niger, eastern Burkina Faso, northern Benin, as well as some West African countries.

Gallery

See also 
Sudano-Sahelian architecture

References 

Sahel
Architecture in Nigeria
Hausa
Architecture in Niger